was a Japanese actor and voice actor working for Mausu Promotion. His wife, Masako Nozawa, is also a voice actress.

Biography
Tsukada learned acting at Engeki Kenkyūjo (青年演劇研究所), which he completed in 1959. In 1964 he was a member of the acting troupe Gekidan Tōgei (劇団東芸). Later, he joined the Agency Mausu Promotion under contract and shifted to voice acting for anime and dubbing for foreign productions. He often voiced a dignified, high-ranking character or an older man.

Tsukada died on January 27, 2014.

Filmography

Films

Tokusatsu

Television animation

Original video animation (OVA)

Theatrical animation

Video games

Dubbing

References

External links
 Masaaki Tsukada at GamePlaza-Haruka Voice Acting Database 
 Masaaki Tsukada at Hitoshi Doi's Seiyuu Database 
 Masaaki Tsukada at Ryu's Seiyuu Info
 
 

1938 births
2014 deaths
Japanese male video game actors
Japanese male voice actors
Male voice actors from Kanagawa Prefecture
Mausu Promotion voice actors
Voice actors from Kawasaki, Kanagawa